The United People's Movement may refer to:
 United People's Movement (Antigua and Barbuda)
 United People's Movement (Colombia)
 United People's Movement (Kyrgyzstan)
 United People's Movement (Namibia)
 United People's Movement (Saint Vincent and the Grenadines)